Annemarie, the Bride of the Company is a 1932 German comedy film directed by Carl Boese and starring Lucie Englisch, Paul Heidemann and Albert Paulig.  It was shot at the Babelsberg Studios in Berlin. The film's sets were designed by the art director Willi Herrmann.

Cast

References

Bibliography 
 
 Jacobsen, Wolfgang. Babelsberg: das Filmstudio. Argon, 1994.
 Klaus, Ulrich J. Deutsche Tonfilme: Jahrgang 1932. Klaus-Archiv, 1988.

External links 
 

1932 comedy films
German comedy films
1932 films
Films of the Weimar Republic
1930s German-language films
Films directed by Carl Boese
Military humor in film
German black-and-white films
1930s German films
Films shot at Babelsberg Studios